I Am Michael is a 2015 American biographical drama film written and directed by Justin Kelly. Based on the journalist Benoit Denizet-Lewis' New York Times Magazine article "My Ex-Gay Friend", the film stars James Franco, Zachary Quinto, Emma Roberts, and Charlie Carver. Franco plays Michael Glatze, a gay activist who renounces homosexuality and becomes a Christian pastor. Filming ran in New York City from August 11 to August 30, 2014.

The film was released in a limited release and through video on demand on January 27, 2017, by Brainstorm Media.

Premise 
Based on a true story, the film depicts gay activist Michael Glatze, who rejects homosexuality and becomes a Christian pastor.

Cast 
 James Franco as Michael Glatze
 Zachary Quinto as Bennett
 Emma Roberts as Rebekah
 Charlie Carver as Tyler
 Avan Jogia as Nico Gladstone
 Devon Graye as Cory
 Leven Rambin as Catherine
 Daryl Hannah as Deborah
 Lesley Ann Warren as Susan
 Blake Lee as Benoit
 Kevin Cahoon as Peter

Production 

On April 1, 2014, James Franco was added to the film to play Michael Glatze, a gay activist who later renounced homosexuality. Justin Kelly was set to direct the film Michael based on Benoit Denizet-Lewis' New York Times Magazine article "My Ex-Gay Friend", while Gus Van Sant would executive produce the film. On July 14, Zachary Quinto, Emma Roberts, and Chris Zylka joined the cast of the film. Quinto would play Bennett, the former boyfriend of Franco's character, Roberts would play his girlfriend, and Zylka would play another past love interest.

Director Justin Kelly said that "this isn't just a story about an 'ex-gay', it's actually a very relatable story about the power of belief and the desire to belong". On August 14, Charlie Carver joined the film to play Tyler, who gets involved in a relationship with Michael and Bennett and is heartbroken when Michael rejects homosexuality. On August 15, Avan Jogia joined the film as Nico, a young man whom Michael meets and falls for along his journey. On August 18, Lesley Ann Warren joined the film's cast to play Quinto's character's mother. On August 25, Daryl Hannah joined the film to play Deborah, who runs a Colorado Buddhist retreat where Michael goes to find solace.

Filming 
Principal photography began on August 11, 2014, in New York City as actor Franco shared images from the set. On August 20, Franco was spotted during filming on Ocean Avenue in East Rockaway. The production wrapped on August 31, 2014 in Baldwin, New York. Also present in film is Musician/Artist Soda, seen as a dancer in a few scenes. He also supplied artwork for the set. This is notable to mention as he is an alumnus of East Rockaway High School under his birth name.

Release
The film was released at the 2015 Sundance Film Festival, and also screened in the Panorama section of the 65th Berlin International Film Festival. It received its California premiere during the 17th FilmOut San Diego LGBT Film Festival. The film was the opening night film of the Frameline Film Festival on June 18, 2015 at the Castro Theatre in San Francisco. Brainstorm Media acquired distribution rights to the film, and set the film for a limited release and through video on demand on January 27, 2017.

Reception
The film drew mostly mixed reviews. On review aggregator website Rotten Tomatoes, the film holds an approval rating of 63% based on 35 reviews, and an average rating of 6.1/10. The website's critical consensus reads, "I Am Michael takes a determinedly balanced approach to its complex subject, and although the results don't always add up, they're anchored by strong work from James Franco." On Metacritic, the film has a weighted average score of 56 out of 100, based on 19 critics, indicating "mixed or average".

Peter Debruge of Variety wrote, "An unusually nuanced James Franco carries this complex portrait of a man who came out and fought to encourage other LGBT youth before converting to conservative Christianity," but concluded that the film was too dry and kept the title character too distant and veiled in its attempt to be impartial.

Boyd van Hoeij wrote in The Hollywood Reporter, "Thankfully, the screenplay doesn't portray the story in simple terms of good or evil, but that doesn't mean that there's quite enough nuance or insight to constantly elevate the material above the level of a well-made-but-TV-ready biopic." Indiewire's Eric Kohn gave the film a B+ grade.

See also
 List of lesbian, gay, bisexual or transgender-related films of 2015

References

External links 
 
 

2015 films
2015 biographical drama films
2015 directorial debut films
2015 LGBT-related films
2000s in LGBT history
American biographical drama films
American LGBT-related films
Ex-gay movement
Films about LGBT and Christianity
Films based on newspaper and magazine articles
Films set in the 2000s
Films shot in New York City
Gay-related films
LGBT-related drama films
LGBT-related films based on actual events
2010s English-language films
2010s American films
LGBT-related biographical films